Hippopotamus creutzburgi, the Cretan dwarf hippopotamus, is an extinct species of hippopotamus from the island of Crete. It lived on the island from the Early Pleistocene to early Middle Pleistocene, and probably descended from Hippopotamus antiquus. It was considerably smaller than H. antiquus, weighing approximately 400 kilograms. It was one of only two large herbivores on the island during its existence, alongside Mammuthus creticus, with large predators being absent. It is characteristic of the Kritimys biozone. It is known from abundant remains collected from the Katharo basin in the eastern uplands of Crete, approximately 1100-1200 metres above sea level, as well as much rarer remains found in coastal caves. Analysis of its limbs suggests that it was more adapted to terrestrial locomotion than living hippopotamus, primarily walking on its hooves rather than its footpads as in living hippopotamus, and capable of traversing the rugged terrain of Crete. Analysis of its teeth suggests that it had a grazing diet, similar to modern Hippopotamus amphibius. The previous suggestion that the species can be divided into two subspecies is not supported by modern research.

The first remains of the species were described in 1845 by Richard Owen. They were subsequently subject to a long and convoluted taxonomic history, before the species name H. creutzburgi was coined by Boekschoten & Sondaar in  1966.

See also
Cyprus dwarf hippopotamus
Hippopotamus melitensis
Hippopotamus pentlandi

References

Extinct hippopotamuses
Pleistocene even-toed ungulates
Prehistoric mammals of Europe
Prehistoric Crete
Fossil taxa described in 1966